Teen Mom: Young Moms Club is an American reality television series on MTV. It premiered on August 30, 2018 as Pretty Little Mamas before being pulled and retooled under the Teen Mom franchise name in 2019.

Pretty Little Mamas followed the lives of five young moms who also happen to be close friends - as they learn to struggle with life, love, parenthood, and careers. Pretty Little Mamas premiered to only 440,000 viewers and aired only two episodes and a preview episode before being taken off of the air. The show was retooled in 2019 and added a new cast member.

Cast
 Alyssa Abrenica
 Chandlar Walby
 Cheyenne Latu
 Nicole Pleskow
 Nikki Hussey
 Heather Miinch

Episodes

As Pretty Little Mamas (2018)

As Teen Mom: Young Moms Club (2019)

References

2010s American reality television series
2018 American television series debuts
2019 American television series endings
American television spin-offs
MTV reality television series
Television series about teenagers